A falooda is a Mughlai cuisine version of a cold dessert made with noodles. It has origins in the Persian dish faloodeh, variants of which are found across West, Central, and South Asia. Traditionally it is made by mixing rose syrup, vermicelli, and sweet basil seeds with milk, often served with ice cream. The vermicelli used for preparing falooda is made from wheat, arrowroot, cornstarch, or sago.'History

The origin of falooda goes back to Iran (Persia), where a similar dessert, Faloodeh, was popular. The dessert came to late Medieval India with the many Central Asian dynasties that invaded and settled in South Asia in the 16th to 18th century. The present form of falooda was developed in the Mughal Empire and spread with its conquests. The Persianate rulers who succeeded from the Mughals patronized the dessert with their own adaptations, specifically in Hyderabad Deccan and the Carnatic areas of present-day India. This dessert is now a part of Indian cuisine, Pakistani cuisine, Bangladeshi cuisine and Sri Lankan cuisine and is served on weddings and other occasions.

Metaphorical references
In idiomatic Hindustani,  is sometimes used as a reference to something that has been shredded, which is an allusion to the vermicelli noodles.

Variants 
 Some Indian versions consist of translucent wheat-starch noodles, and flavoured syrup.
 In Myanmar, phaluda (ဖာလူဒါ) is made with basil seeds, grass jelly, egg pudding, vanilla ice cream, sweetened milk and rose syrup. More elaborate versions also incorporate sago, rice noodles, fruit jelly, and chopped fruit. 
 In southern Bangladesh, falooda is made with pandan extract, pistachios, sago pearls, creamed coconut, mango, milk and vermicelli, and may even include strong black tea.
 Malaysia and Singapore have a similar drink called bandung.
 Thailand has a similar drink, nam maenglak (น้ำแมงลัก), which is made with lemon basil seeds, shredded jelly, tapioca pearls, and Job's tears mixed with sugar, water, and rose water.
 The Iraqi Kurds make a version with thicker vermicelli.
 The Mauritian version is called alouda''.

See also

 Cendol

References

External links

 How To Make Falooda (Indian Dessert Drink) (archived 3 August 2011)

Indian desserts
Pakistani desserts
Mughlai cuisine
Burmese desserts and snacks
Bangladeshi desserts
Bengali desserts
Sri Lankan drinks
Indo-Caribbean cuisine
Fijian cuisine
Mauritian cuisine
Milk dishes